The surname Troy is anglicised from the following surnames:

 The Gaelic-Irish surnames
 Ó Tréamháin (Meaning unknown - possibly descendant of journals)
 Ó Troighthigh (Descendant of foot-soldier)
 Ó Turráin (Meaning unknown - possibly descendant of turrets)
 The Anglo-Norman (or French) toponymic surname
 de Troyes (from Troyes, France)
 de Troye (from Mitchell Troy, Wales)

Members of the above families over time have utilised the anglicised form of Troy, making members of all five unrelated families indistinguishable. Y-DNA testing has opened up the possibility to discern individual family groups utilising the Troy surname and a Family Tree DNA Troy Surname group has been established here ( https://www.familytreedna.com/groups/troy/about ) to research each surname. Notable mentions of the surname include:

People 

Arts and entertainment
 Dermot Troy (1927–1962), Irish singer
 Doris Troy (1937–2004), American R&B singer
 Hagen Troy, Singaporean-born composing artist
 Hugh Troy (1906–1964), American painter
 John Troy (hurler) (born 1971), Offaly GAA hurler and all-star
 Judy Troy (born 1951), American university professor, short story writer and novelist
 Kali Troy (born 1971), American voice-over actress
 Leroy Troy (born 1966), American banjo player
 Louise Troy (1933–1994), American stage and screen actress
 Pastor Troy (Micah LeVar Troy, born 1977), American rapper, actor, and record producer
 William Troy (educator) (1903–1961), American essayist, teacher and film critic

History and current affairs
 William Troy (Medal of Honor) (1848–1907), US Navy sailor awarded the Medal of Honor

Politics and law
 Dan Troy (born 1948), Ohio, United States, politician
 John Troy (Australian politician) (born 1941), doctor and member of the Western Australian Legislative Assembly, 1977–1980
 John Weir Troy (1868–1942), American Democratic politician, Governor of Alaska Territory, 1933–1939
 Leo Troy, Canadian politician
 Frank Troy (1877–1953), Australian politician
 Paddy Troy (1908–1978), Australian trade unionist and communist activist
 Robert Troy, Irish politician
 Tevi Troy (born 1967), official in administration of U.S. President George W. Bush, adviser to presidential candidate Mitt Romney

Religion
 Bertie Troy (1931–2007), Roman Catholic priest and All-Ireland Hurling Final winning manager
 E. F. Troy (c. 1855 – 1910), Catholic philanthropist and stained glass artist in Australia
 John Troy (bishop) (1739–1823), Roman Catholic Archbishop of Dublin

Science and academics
 Elizabeth Mary Troy (1914–2011), Irish obstetrician

Sports
 "Bun" Troy (1888–1918), German-American major league baseball pitcher
 "Dasher" Troy (1856–1938), American major league baseball player
 Gregg Troy (born 1950), American college and Olympic swimming coach
 Jack Troy (1927–1995), Australian rugby league footballer
 Jim Troy (hurling) (born 1960), retired Irish hurling player
 Jim Troy (ice hockey) (born 1953), American former professional ice hockey player
 Mike Troy (1940–2019), American swimmer

People with non-anglicised versions 
de Troyes
 Chrétien de Troyes (1160–1191), French poet and trouvère known for his writing on Arthurian subjects
 Richard de Troye (fl. 1247–1262), was a Norman Knight and landowner in County Kilkenny, Ireland.
 Theobald de Troye (fl. 1317), was a Norman Knight and landowner in County Kilkenny, Ireland. Quite likely a descendant of Richard De Troye as they held the same land and paid knights fees in County Kilkenny.
 Guillaume de Troyes (fl. 1357), was a royal falconer during the reign of King Edward III.
John de Troye (died 1371), a Welsh-born Crown official and judge in fourteenth century Ireland, who held the offices of Chancellor of the Exchequer of Ireland and Lord Treasurer of Ireland.
 François de Troy (1645–1730), French painter and engraver
 Jean François de Troy (1679–1752), French painter and tapestry designer
 Edward Troye (1808–1874), Swiss-born American painter
 Pierre de Troyes (died 1868), a captain that led the French capture of Moose Factory, Rupert House, and Fort Albany in Hudson Bay 1686.
 Olivia Troye (born 1977), American former government official and vice president of strategy, policy, and plans at the National Insurance Crime Bureau
 Raymond Troye (1908–2003), Belgian officer and writer

Ó Troighthigh
 Aicher Ua Traighthech (died 1002/1003), soldier of Corcomroe in the medieval period and mentioned in the Irish Annals.
 Domhnall Albanach Ó Troighthigh (fl. 1482), was an Irish scribe and physician.

Fictional characters  

 Christian Troy, a fictional character played by Julian McMahon on the FX Networks series Nip/Tuck. 
 Donna Troy, fictional superheroine appearing in DC Comics

Place Names originating from the Troy (or variant) surname 

 Ballytrehy / Baile Uí Throithigh (The town of Ó Troithigh), a region of County Tipperary, Ireland.
 Castletroy / Caladh an Treoigh (O' Troy's Landing), a suburb of Limerick, County Limerick, Ireland.
 Troy's Gate / Geata an Treoigh (Gate of O' Troy's), an historical gate within the town of Kilkenny, County Kilkenny, Ireland. 
 Troyes, a commune and the capital of the department of Aube in the Grand Est region of north-central France.
 Troyswood / Coill an Treoigh (Wood of O' Troy's), a region of County Kilkenny, Ireland.
 Troyswood Castle, a castle ruins in Troyswood, County Kilkenny, Ireland.
Mitchell Troy / Llanfihangel Troddi (Church of St Michael on the River Trothy) a village and community in Monouthshire, south east Wales.

References

See also 

 Irish medical families
 Ó Troighthigh
 Troy (disambiguation)

Anglicised Irish-language surnames
Surnames
Irish families
Surnames of Irish origin
Families of Irish ancestry
Irish medical families